Jessica Varnish (born 19 November 1990) is a former British track cyclist. Varnish was part of the 2014 world record holding European Championships team sprint champions and is a multiple medalist at the World Championships.

Biography
Jessica Varnish was born in Bromsgrove, Worcestershire on 19 November 1990, the daughter of James "Jim" Varnish, a keen cyclist. She attended South Bromsgrove High School.

At the age of 14, Varnish competed unofficially at the 2006 Junior World Championships in Belgium. She took a second off the British 500m standing start record, setting a new time of 37.1 seconds.

She made her GB Cycling debut at the Austrian Junior International in January 2006. She became a member of British Cycling's Olympic Development Programme whilst still a junior. Being just 17 at the time, Varnish was selected for the programme a year ahead of the rest of her age group, demonstrating British Cycling's belief in her potential.

Her first performance at senior level was in the 2008 UCI Track Cycling World Championships in Manchester.

In March 2009, Varnish was awarded the "junior female sports personality of the year" trophy at the Sports Partnership Herefordshire and Worcestershire Sports Awards.

Virgin Trains West Coast named its Pendolino train 390027 after her on 29 June 2011.

On 18 February, Varnish competed at the 2012 UCI Track Cycling World Cup in the new Olympic Velodrome. Along with her team-mate Victoria Pendleton, they broke the world record of the women's team sprint taking gold.

At the 2012 Summer Olympics, Varnish and Pendleton broke the world record in the qualifying stages of the team sprint before being relegated in the semi-finals.

In April 2016 The Daily Telegraph reported that Varnish's Olympic Podium Programme contract with British Cycling had not been renewed, with Performance Director Shane Sutton stating that the decision was due to Varnish's performances over the previous three years, and denying that it was related to comments she had made in interviews at the 2016 UCI Track Cycling World Championships which were critical of the selections that had been made for the women's team sprint squad in their qualifying campaign for the 2016 Summer Olympics, which was ultimately unsuccessful. Varnish claimed in the two-year Olympic qualifying period she had gained more qualifying points than any other British cyclist, in the team sprint she had consistently performed in the world top 5 and also qualified for the Olympic places in individual sprint and Keirin. In a subsequent interview with the Daily Mail, Varnish made allegations that Sutton had made sexist comments when discussing the non-renewal of her contract. In April 2016 Sutton was suspended by British Cycling, and he immediately resigned rather than mounting a defence.

Palmarès

Track

2005
1st  sprint, British National Track Championships – U16
2nd 500m TT, British National Track Championships – U16
2nd Scratch race, British National Track Championships – U16

2006
1st  sprint, British National Track Championships – U16
2nd 500m TT, British National Track Championships – U16
2nd Scratch race, British National Track Championships – U16

2007
1st  keirin, 2007 European Track Championships – Junior
1st  sprint, British National Track Championships – Junior
2nd 500m TT, 2007 European Track Championships – Junior
2nd Individual Sprint, UCI Junior Track World Championships
2nd 500m TT, British National Track Championships – Junior
3rd 500m TT, British National Track Championships – Senior
3rd Individual Sprint, British National Track Championships – Senior

2008
1st  keirin, 2008 European Track Championships – Junior
1st  500m TT, 2008 European Track Championships – Junior
1st  500m TT, British National Track Championships – Junior
1st  sprint, British National Track Championships – Junior
1st Team Sprint, round 1, 2008–2009 UCI Track Cycling World Cup Classics, Manchester (with Anna Blyth)
2nd British National Team Sprint Championships (with Helen Scott)
3rd Keirin, British National Track Championships – Senior
3rd Individual Sprint, 2008 European Track Championships – Junior

2011
1st  500m TT, 2011 British National Track Championships – Senior
1st  Team Sprint, 2011 European Track Championships (with Victoria Pendleton)
1st  500m TT, 2011 European Track Championships – U23
1st  Team Sprint, 2011 European Track Championships – U23 (with Becky James)
3rd sprint, 2011 European Track Championships – U23

2012
1st Team sprint, round 4, 2011–2012 UCI Track Cycling World Cup Classics, London (with Victoria Pendleton)
1st Team sprint, round 1, 2011–2012 UCI Track Cycling World Cup Classics, Cali (with Becky James)
1st Team sprint, round 2, 2011–2012 UCI Track Cycling World Cup Classics, Glasgow (with Becky James)
2nd Individual Sprint, round 2, 2011–2012 UCI Track Cycling World Cup Classics, Glasgow
3rd Individual Sprint, round 1, 2011–2012 UCI Track Cycling World Cup Classics, Cali

2013
1st  500m TT, British National Track Championships
1st  Team Sprint, British National Track Championships
1st  Individual Sprint, British National Track Championships
1st  Keirin, British National Track Championships
Revolution
1st Sprint – Round 1, Manchester
2nd Keirin – Round 1, Manchester
3rd Individual Sprint, 2013 European Track Championships
3rd Team sprint, 2013 European Track Championships (with Becky James)
3rd Cottbus Individual Sprint

2014
1st Sprint, Revolution – Round 4, Manchester
1st 500m Time Trial, Cottbuser SprintCup
Open des Nations sur Piste de Roubaix
1st Sprint
1st Team Sprint (with Victoria Williamson)
1st  500m TT, British National Track Championships
1st  Individual Sprint, British National Track Championships
1st  Team sprint, British National Track Championships (with Dannielle Khan)
1st  Keirin, British National Track Championships
3rd Team Sprint, UCI Track World Championships (with Becky James)
Commonwealth Games 
3rd  Sprint
3rd  500m Time Trial 
3rd Team Sprint, GP von Deutschland im Sprint (with Katy Marchant)
3rd Sprint, Cottbuser Nächte

2015
Revolution
1st Keirin – Round 3, Manchester
1st Sprint – Round 3, Manchester
2nd Sprint – Round 1, Derby
2nd 500m Time Trial – Round 1, Derby
1st British National Team Sprint Championships (with Katy Marchant)
3rd Keirin, British National Track Championships
2nd Keirin, Öschelbronn
3rd Sprint, Singen

References

External links

1990 births
Living people
English female cyclists
English track cyclists
Sportspeople from Bromsgrove
Cyclists at the 2012 Summer Olympics
Olympic cyclists of Great Britain
Cyclists at the 2014 Commonwealth Games
Commonwealth Games bronze medallists for England
Commonwealth Games medallists in cycling
Medallists at the 2014 Commonwealth Games